C21orf62 is a protein that, in humans, is encoded by the C21orf62 gene. C21orf62 is found on human chromosome 21, and it is thought to be expressed in tissues of the brain and reproductive organs. Additionally, C21orf62 is highly expressed in ovarian surface epithelial cells during normal regulation, but is not expressed in cancerous ovarian surface epithelial cells.

Gene 
Common aliases of C21orf62 are C21orf120, PRED81, and B37. C21orf62 is located on chromosome 21 in humans, and is specifically at the q22.11 position. The C21orf62 gene is 4132 base pairs in length and contains five exons.

mRNA 
The mRNA sequence of C21orf62 in humans has one known isoform. This isoform is called uncharacterized protein C21orf62 isoform X1. This isoform is 458 base pairs, or 104 amino acids, in length, and it is significantly shorter than the most observed sequence of C21orf62 in humans. In addition to having an isoform, C21orf62 also has splice variants. All splice variants encode the same gene, but the differences in splice variant sequences occur in the 5' untranslated region of the mRNA sequence.

Protein

General protein characteristics 

The C21orf62 protein in humans has a sequence that is 219 amino acids in length. The primary sequence of C21orf62 in humans has a molecular weight of 24.9 kDa and an isoelectric point of 8. When it's cleavable signal peptide, which spans amino acids 1-19, is removed, it has a molecular weight of 22.8 kDa and an isoelectric point of 7.8.

Protein composition 

C21orf62 in humans has higher cysteine and lower valine concentrations than expected compared to other human proteins. This trend, as showed in Table 1, is the same for other mammals. It does not, however, occur in taxa other than mammalia.

Protein structure 

The protein structure of C21orf62 in humans consists of a combination of alpha helices and beta sheets. Figure 1 shows a predicted structure of the protein.

Post-translational modifications 

C21orf62 has a myristoylation site from amino acid 26–31. It has a sumoylation site from amino acid 132–135. Additionally, it has a nuclear export signal from amino acid 98-104.

Expression

Tissue expression 

C21orf62 is expressed in human tissues of the brain and reproductive organs.

Expression level 

C21orf62 in humans is moderately expressed in the brain, kidneys, pancreas, prostate, testes, and ovaries.

Regulation of expression 

C21orf62 is expressed during blastocyst, fetus, and adult states of human development. It is overexpressed during some tumor states, including pancreatic, gastrointestinal, germ cell, and glioma tumors.

Function 
The specific function of C21orf62 in humans is not yet well understood.

Interacting proteins 
C21orf62 is thought to potentially interact with nine other proteins. These interactions are shown in Table 2, and they were found through text mining.

Clinical significance 
C21orf62 over or under expression is linked to some types of cancerous cells and tumors.

Homology

Paralogs 

There are no known paralogs of C21orf62 in humans at this time.

Orthologs 

There are currently 193 organisms that are known to be orthologs of C21orf62. The orthologs of C21orf62 are deuterostome animals in the clade Chordata. Table 3 shows a range of C21orf62 orthologs, their NCBI accession numbers, sequence lengths, and sequence identity to the C21orf62 human protein. At this time, C21orf62 is not known to have any protostome or invertebrate orthologs.

Evolution rate 

C21orf62 has an evolution rate that is faster than cytochrome C and fibrinogen. Figure 2 shows the rate of evolution of the C21orf62 gene over the past 473 million years.

External links

References

Genes on human chromosome 21